The Queens Domain, also known as The Domain to locals, is a small hilly area of bushland just north-east of the CBD of Hobart, Tasmania, Australia, alongside the Derwent River.  It is traditionally land that "belongs to the people", as commissioned by the Governor in 1860.

On the side of the hill facing the river sits Government House, one of the finest in the Commonwealth of Nations, and the Royal Tasmanian Botanical Gardens. Nearby was the original location of the now closed Hobart Zoo. Closer to the city, several sporting complexes are located, including the Hobart Aquatic Centre, Hobart International Tennis Centre the Domain Athletic Centre, and the Hobart TCA Ground.  The Hobart Cenotaph is also located on the Queens Domain.

The north-west face, along with most of the area, is covered in bushland, as well as a few small community halls, picnic areas, barbecues and a community green.

References

Geography of Hobart
Localities of City of Hobart